Vinicius Moreira Lanza (born 22 March 1997, in Belo Horizonte) is a Brazilian swimmer. He competed at the collegiate level for Indiana University. He is a member of the London Roar team, competing in Season 2 of the International Swimming League (ISL). The ISL is an annual professional swimming league featuring a team-based competition format with fast-paced race sessions. Ten teams featuring the world's best swimmers will compete for the ISL title in 2020.

International career

2015–20

At the 2015 FINA World Junior Swimming Championships, he won a silver medal in the 100-metre butterfly.

He was at the 2017 Summer Universiade, finishing 7th in the Men's 100 metre butterfly.

At the 2018 Pan Pacific Swimming Championships in Japan, he won a bronze medal in the 100-metre butterfly, with a time of 51.44 . He also finished 4th in the Men's 4 × 100 metre medley relay.

On 25 August 2018, at the José Finkel Trophy(short course competition), he broke the South American record in the 200m medley with a time of 1:52.16.

At the 2019 World Aquatics Championships in Gwangju, South Korea, in the Men's 4 × 100 metre medley relay, he finished 6th, helping Brazil qualify for the Tokyo 2020 Olympics. He also finished 12th in the Men's 100 metre butterfly, and 28th in the Men's 50 metre butterfly.

At the 2019 Pan American Games held in Lima, Peru, Lanza won a gold medal in the Mixed 4 × 100 metre medley relay (by participating at heats), a silver medal in the Men's 4 × 100 metre medley relay, and a bronze medal in the Men's 100 metre butterfly.

2020 Summer Olympics
He competed at the 2020 Summer Olympics, where he finished 26th in the Men's 100 metre butterfly, 25th in the  Men's 200 metre individual medley and was disqualified at the Men's 4 × 100 metre medley relay.

2021–24

At the 2021 FINA World Swimming Championships (25 m) in Abu Dhabi, United Arab Emirates, he finished 4th in the Men's 4 × 50 metre medley relay, 4th in the Men's 4 × 100 metre medley relay, 10th in the Men's 100 metre butterfly and 21st in the Men's 50 metre butterfly.

At the 2022 World Aquatics Championships held in Budapest, Hungary, he finished 23rd in the Men's 200 metre individual medley, 25th in the Men's 100 metre butterfly and 41st in the Men's 50 metre butterfly.

Personal life

On 22 December 2022, Lanza announced his engagement to fellow Olympian and American swimmer Annie Lazor whom he had known from training extensively with at Indiana University in Bloomington.

References

External links

Brazilian male freestyle swimmers
Living people
Brazilian male butterfly swimmers
1997 births
Sportspeople from Belo Horizonte
Swimmers at the 2019 Pan American Games
Pan American Games medalists in swimming
Pan American Games gold medalists for Brazil
Pan American Games silver medalists for Brazil
Pan American Games bronze medalists for Brazil
Medalists at the 2019 Pan American Games
Swimmers at the 2020 Summer Olympics
Olympic swimmers of Brazil
Indiana Hoosiers men's swimmers
21st-century Brazilian people